Eskridge is an unincorporated community located in Montgomery County, Mississippi, United States, located approximately  south of Duck Hill and  northeast of Winona. Eskridge is located on U.S. Route 51.

References

Unincorporated communities in Montgomery County, Mississippi
Unincorporated communities in Mississippi